Maamar Bettayeb (born 7 June 1953) is a control theorist, educator and inventor. He is the author of publications on understanding the singular value decomposition and model order reduction. Bettayeb is also a promoter of scientific research.

Early years
Bettayeb continued his elementary and middle studies in Beni Amrane before joining the polyvalent high school of Tizi Ouzou in 1969 to follow his secondary studies in the Mathematics sector. After obtaining his baccalaureate in 1972 with a first class honors, he obtained a scholarship from the Algerian state to continue his university studies in the United States at the University of Southern California in Los Angeles.

He obtained his bachelor's degree in automatic control in 1976, then his master's degree in 1978.

Bettayeb obtained his PhD degree in 1981 following his defense of his thesis at the University of Southern California in the Department of Electrical Engineering, and whose title was "Approximation of Linear Systems: New Approaches Based on Singular Value Decomposition", under the supervision of Professor Emeritus Leonard M. Silverman.

Career
He worked as a research scientist for a year in Houston, Texas until 1982 in the Bellaire Research Center at Shell Oil Development Company, in the development of seismic signal processing deconvolution algorithms for the purpose of Gas and Oil exploration. Back in Algeria, he was recruited by the Center for Development of Advanced Technologies (CDTA) where he headed the instrumentation and control department from 1982 until 1988, and he led various research and development projects in the field of modeling, simulation, and control design of large scale energy systems with applications to nuclear, solar, wind and electric power systems.

He then emigrated to Saudi Arabia where he joined King Fahd University of Petroleum and Minerals in Dhahran where he worked for two years until 1990.

During the year 2000 he joined the staff of the University of Sharjah as a professor, where he held research and administrative positions.

Since September 2014, Bettayeb has been vice-rector at this university where he is in charge of graduation and research. He is also associate professor in automatic control and signal processing within the Center of Excellence in Intelligent Engineering Systems (CEIES) at King Abdulaziz University in a research laboratory.

During his career, he published more than 350 scientific journal and conference papers.

Bettayeb was an External Examiner for Electrical Engineering Programs at the University of Malaya in Malaysia from 2001 to 2004.

He also participated as a visiting professor at the Helsinki University of Technology in Finland during the years 2001 to 2003, where he gave short courses, research seminars, workshops and participated in the examination of doctoral students.

Bettayeb has worked in scientific consulting for the petrochemical industries on behalf of several companies, and has also taken part in several R&D funded projects in the fields of control and signal processing applications.

He chaired the International Symposium on Signal Processing and its applications (ISSPA) 2007 conference organized by University of Jijel, and was also the chair/co-chair of the program committee of several conferences.

He was Deputy Editor-in-Chief of the International Journal of Modeling, Identification and Control, is currently the Head of the Intelligent Systems Research Group at the University of Sharjah where he also led the strategic planning development of the research.

Research interests
Bettayeb has been interested in recent years in research areas related to:
H-infinity methods in control theory
Rational approximation
Signal processing
Image processing
Process control
Networked control systems
Fractional-order systems
Fractional-order control
Estimation theory
Nonlinear regression
Filtering problem and nonlinear filters
Soft computing
Wavelets
Renewable energy
Engineering education

Awards
Professor Bettayeb has received several awards and honors during his career in recognition of his work, including:
 Prize for the best research distinguished in 1993-94 and 1998–99 at King Fahd University of Petroleum and Minerals (KFUPM).
 Outstanding adviser award in 1996–97 at KFUPM.
 Award for the best researcher at the University of Sharjah (UoS) in 2001–2002, 2006–2007, 2007–2008 and 2010–2011.
 Sharjah Islamic Bank's Best Research Paper Award in 2003–2004.
 Prize for the best research project in 2006–2007 at UoS.
 Supervisor of the award for best student article, supervisor of the award for best student project in 2006–2007 at UOS.
 Director of the prize for the best master's thesis in 2009–2010 at UoS.
 Award for the best teaching at the University of Sharjah in 2011–2012.
 IEOM Distinguished Leadership Award in 2020.

See also

List of Algerians
List of people in systems and control
List of systems scientists
University of Southern California
King Fahd University of Petroleum and Minerals
University of Sharjah
University of Malaya
Helsinki University of Technology
King Abdulaziz University

Bibliography

References

Videos

External links

 Maamar Bettayeb on University of Sharjah homepage

1953 births
Algerian scientists
Living people
People from Beni Amrane
People from Thénia District
People from Boumerdès Province
Kabyle people
Algerian educators
Algerian academics
Systems scientists
Control theorists
University of Southern California alumni
University of Southern California people
Academic staff of King Fahd University of Petroleum and Minerals
Academic staff of the University of Sharjah
People associated with the University of Malaya
Academic staff of the University of Malaya
Academic staff of the Helsinki University of Technology
Academic staff of King Abdulaziz University
21st-century Algerian people